The Ministry of Water Resources of the Republic of Somaliland (MoWR)  is a ministry of the Somaliland cabinet in charge of the development and regulation of Somaliland's water resources.
The current minister is Mohamed Muse Diriye.

Ministers of Water

See also
 Somaliland National Armed Forces
 Politics of Somaliland
 Hargeisa Water Agency

References

External links
Official Site of the Government of Somaliland

Politics of Somaliland
Government ministries of Somaliland